John Marlay may refer to:
 John Marlay (businessman), Australian businessman
 John Marlay (MP), English merchant, military commander and politician

See also
 John Marley, American actor
 John Marley (mining engineer), English mining engineer